The Whitehill–Wise family is a family of politicians from the United States.

Members 
John Whitehill 1729–1815, Judge in Pennsylvania 1777, member of the Pennsylvania State Legislature 1780, U.S. Representative from Pennsylvania 1803–1807.
Robert Whitehill 1738–1813, member of the Pennsylvania State Legislature, U.S. Representative from Pennsylvania 1805–1813. Brother of John Whitehill.
James Whitehill 1762–1822, Judge in Pennsylvania 1811, U.S. Representative from Pennsylvania 1813. Son of John Whitehill.
John C. Kunkel 1898–1970, U.S. Representative from Pennsylvania 1939–1951, 1961–1967, candidate for U.S. Senator from Pennsylvania 1950. Great great grandson of Robert Whitehill and grandson of John Christian Kunkel.
Jonathan Sergeant 1746–1793, Delegate to the Continental Congress from Pennsylvania 1776, Pennsylvania Attorney General 1777.
John Sergeant 1779–1852, U.S. Representative from Pennsylvania 1815–1823, 1827–1829, 1837–1841, candidate for Vice President of the United States 1832. Son of Jonathan Sergeant, great grandfather of John C. Kunkel.
Henry A. Wise 1806–1876, U.S. Representative from Virginia 1833–1844, U.S. Minister to Brazil 1844–1847, delegate to the Virginia Constitutional Convention 1850, Governor of Virginia 1856–1859. Son-in-law of John Sergeant.
Richard Alsop Wise 1843–1900, member of the Virginia State Legislature, U.S. Representative from Virginia 1898–1899 1900. Son of Henry A. Wise.
John Sergeant Wise 1846–1913, U.S. District Attorney for Eastern District of Virginia 1882–1883, U.S. Representative from Virginia 1883–1885, candidate for Governor of Virginia 1885. Son of Henry A. Wise.
George D. Wise 1831–1898, U.S. Representative from Virginia 1881–1885. Nephew of Henry A. Wise.

Political families of the United States
Wise family of Virginia